Prospekt is a Russian term describing a broad, multi-lane and very long straight street in urban areas, which serves as an arterial road. The use of "prospekt" as a road-related concept originated in the Russian Empire.

As an urban area sprawls along transportation routes, the roads outside of city limits called chaussee (French for road surface) often also become converted into prospekts.

History
In the first years of construction of St Petersburg (in the early 18th century), the city's broad ways were called "perspectiva" (literally, visual or graphical perspective). One of the world-known prospekts of Petersburg is Nevsky Prospekt.

The name "prospekt" was widely used in the USSR where it was traditionally used for the main avenues in the newly constructed cities and cities’ blocks. Later on, the term came into the national languages of the Soviet Republics which became independent states in 1991.

Etymology
Russian lexicographer Vladimir Dal in his "Explanatory Dictionary of the Live Great Russian language" marked prospekt as a loanword from French.

Prospekt is cognate with the English term prospect, both derive from Latin prospectus "view, outlook". In the 18th century Russia, prospekt was used specifically for very long straight streets, especially in St. Petersburg, because they afforded a spectacular view from one end to the other when looking down them.

Notable streets named "Prospekt"
 Nevsky Prospekt
 Moskovsky Prospekt
 Kutuzovsky Prospekt
 Leningradsky Prospekt
 Leninsky Prospekt

See also
 Arterial road
 Avenue
 Boulevard
 Link road
 Parkway

References

Types of streets
Russian language
!
Streets by type